Jason Warner (born  1985) is a Canadian hardware store worker who won a World Series of Poker bracelet in the 2007 $1,500 No-Limit Hold'em short handed. Warner does not like playing poker online, preferring to play at the River Rock Casino near Vancouver. Prior to winning his bracelet he participated in one other WSOP event and a Canadian Poker Tour event where he won $22,000.  After winning a bracelet at the WSOP, he finished in the money at World Poker Tour's $10,000 Bellagio Cup III tournament.

As of 2008, Warner has tournament winnings in excess of $490,000.

World Series of Poker bracelets

References

Canadian poker players
World Series of Poker bracelet winners
1980s births
Living people